Borneogena is a genus of moths belonging to the subfamily Tortricinae of the family Tortricidae.

Species
Borneogena antigrapha Diakonoff, 1941
Borneogena siniaevi Razowski, 2009

See also
 List of Tortricidae genera

References

 , 1941, Treubia 18: 403.
 , 2005, World Catalogue of Insects 5.

External links
tortricidae.com

Archipini
Tortricidae genera
Taxa named by Alexey Diakonoff